The 1990 Soviet football championship was the 59th seasons of competitive football in the Soviet Union. Dinamo Kiev won the Top League championship becoming the Soviet domestic champions for the thirteenth time.

Honours

Notes = Number in parentheses is the times that club has won that honour. * indicates new record for competition

Soviet Union football championship

Top League

Promotion/relegation play-off
(13th team of the Top League and 4th team of the First League)

Lokomotiv Moscow won the promotion on 3–2 aggregate

First League

Notes:
 The city of Ordzhonikidze was renamed to Vladikavkaz.
 The city of Gorkiy was renamed to Nizhniy Novgorod.
 Kotayk Abovyan played all its home games in the neighboring Yerevan.

Second League

West

Representation
 : 11
  4
 : 3
  2
 : 1
  1

Center

Representation
  20
  2

East

Representation

 : 7
  7
 : 5
 : 1
 : 1
 : 1

Baltic

 ASK Fosforit Tallinn quit the competition after 14 games

Lower Second League

Group 1

Group 2

Group 3

Group 4

Group 5

Group 6

Group 7

Group 8

Group 9

Group 10

Top goalscorers

Top League
 Oleh Protasov (Dinamo Kiev) – 12 goals

First League
Igor Shkvyrin (Pakhtakor Tashkent) – 37 goals

References

External links
 1990 Soviet football championship. RSSSF